Senator Reilly may refer to:

Edward F. Reilly (1856–1890), New York State Senate
Edward R. Reilly (born 1949), Maryland State Senate
Kathryn Reilly (born 1988), Senate of Ireland

See also
Senator O'Reilly (disambiguation)
Senator Riley (disambiguation)
Tom Rielly (born 1966), Iowa State Senate